linux.conf.au (often abbreviated as lca) is Australasia's regional Linux and Open Source conference.  It is a roaming conference, held in a different Australian or New Zealand city every year, coordinated by Linux Australia and organised by local volunteers.

The conference is a non-profit event, with any surplus funds being used to seed the following year's conference and to support the Australian Linux and open source communities. The name is the conference's URL, using the uncommon second-level domain .conf.au.

Conference history
In 1999, Linux kernel hacker Rusty Russell organised the Conference of Australian Linux Users in Melbourne. The first conference held under the linux.conf.au name was held two years later in 
Sydney. The conference is generally held in a different Australian city each time; although from 2006 onward, New Zealand cities have also been hosts. 

Highlights from past conferences include:

 1999: CALU (Conference of Australian Linux Users) was conceived, bankrolled (via his personal credit card) and executed by Linux kernel hacker Rusty Russell.  It laid the foundation for a successful, strongly technical, eclectic and fun conference series.

 2001: the first conference held under the linux.conf.au name.

 2004: a major highlight was the dunking of Linus Torvalds for charity.

 2006: the first conference to be held outside Australia, recognising the importance of the New Zealand Linux community.

 2007: a new feature was an Open Day for non-conference attendees, in which community groups, interest groups and Linux businesses held stands and demonstrations.

 2008: the second time the conference was held in Melbourne. 100 OLPC machines were distributed to random attendees to encourage development. The Speakers dinner was held at St Paul's Cathedral Chapter House, and the Penguin Dinner was held in conjunction with Melbourne's Night Market, playing on the title of Eric Raymond's book, The Cathedral and the Bazaar.

 2009: during the Penguin Dinner, a substantial sum of money was raised for the Save Tasmanian Devils fund – and a pledge made to replace the Tux Logo with the conference mascot, Tuz, to help raise awareness.

 2010: over $33,000 raised for Wellington Lifeflight Helicopter Ambulance service.

 2011: the event was almost washed out by the floods that devastated southern Queensland.  

 2016: preparations almost derailed by a massive storm just before the conference opened.

2020: $24,342 raised and donated to Red Cross for Australian Bush-fire relief

 2021: in May 2020 Linux Australia announced that the planned 2021 conference in Canberra was postponed until 2022 due to the COVID-19 pandemic and a lightweight virtual conference would be held in 2021 instead.

Miniconfs 
Since 2002, a key feature of the conference are the associated "miniconfs". These are half – 2 days streamed gatherings run before the main conference. They have their own programme, but are open for any conference attendee to participate in. 

The first event to have a miniconf was in 2002, with the Debian Miniconf, organised by James Bromberger. This was based upon the idea that DebConf 1 in Bordeaux was a "mini-conf" of the French Libre Software Meeting.   The concept grew in 2004, with the Open-Source in Government (ossig) miniconf, EducationaLinux, Debian Miniconf and GNOME.conf.au. In 2010 the Arduino Miniconf was introduced by Jonathan Oxer, the author of Practical Arduino.

Miniconfs have included those devoted to computer programming, education, security, multimedia, arduino and system administration.

See also
Open Source Developers' Conference

References

External links

 linux.conf.au

Linux conferences
Free-software conferences
Recurring events established in 1999